Moulay Brahim or Mawlāy Ibrāhīm ibn Aḥmad al-Amghārī (died 1661 CE), nicknamed Ṭayr al-Jabal "Bird of the Mountain", was a well-known Moroccan sufi saint. He was the grandson of ʿAbdallāh ibn Ḥusayn al-Ḥassānī, the founder (c. 1525 CE) of the zawiya of Tameslouht, one of the greatest zawiyas in the region of Marrakech. The zawiya of Moulay Brahim was founded in 1628 CE during the reign of the Saʿdī sultan Zaydān al-Nāṣir in the village originally named Kik, and since called Moulay Brahim. It is located on a mountain top off the main road going to Asni, quite close to the big mountains, while the holy town of Tameslouht is situated in the plains on the road to Amizmiz.

References
Mouna Hachim, "Maroc: Au-delà des Moussems, la vie des saints" retrieved on 04--22-2008
 Mouna Hachim; "Dictionnaire des noms de famille du Maroc" histoires et légendes, Casablancha, 2007, 500 p
 Deverdun G., "Tamesluht (Tameslouht)", the history of a religious center, Encyclopédie Berbère, 1986, no 38

Moroccan Sufis
1661 deaths
Year of birth unknown